Fayland House is a house in Buckinghamshire, England, in the Chiltern Hills between the villages of Skirmett and Hambleden. It was designed by David Chipperfield Architects. Fayland House is situated in an Area of Outstanding Natural Beauty.

Appearance 
Fayland House is a single storey, 888 square metre house built to resemble an earthwork.

History 
Fayland House was designed by David Chipperfield Architects for Mike and Maria Spink. The house was completed in 2013. It was awarded first prize in Architectural Review's AR House Awards in 2015.

External links 

Houses in Buckinghamshire
Houses completed in 2013
Modernist architecture in England
Wycombe District

References